HAProxy is a free and open source software that provides a high availability load balancer and reverse proxy for TCP and HTTP-based applications that spreads requests across multiple servers. It is written in C and has a reputation for being fast and efficient (in terms of processor and memory usage).

HAProxy is used by a number of high-profile websites including GoDaddy, GitHub, Bitbucket, Stack Overflow, Reddit, Slack, Speedtest.net, Tumblr, Twitter and Tuenti and is used in the OpsWorks product from Amazon Web Services.

History 
HAProxy was written in 2000 by Willy Tarreau, a core contributor to the Linux kernel, who still maintains the project.

In 2013, the company HAProxy Technologies, LLC was created. The company provides a commercial offering, HAProxy Enterprise and appliance-based application-delivery controllers named ALOHA.

Features 
HAProxy has the following features:

 Layer 4 (TCP) and Layer 7 (HTTP) load balancing
 Multi-factor stickiness
 URL rewriting
 Rate limiting
 SSL/TLS termination
 Gzip compression
 Caching
 PROXY Protocol support
 Scriptable multi-layer Health checking
 Connection and HTTP message logging
 HTTP/2 support on both sides
 WebSocket (RFC6455 and RFC8441)
 UDP/TCP Syslog load-balancing and forwarding/transcribing (RFC3164 and RFC5424)
 Event-driven Multithreaded architecture
 Hitless reloads
 gRPC Support
 Lua and SPOE Support
 API Support
 Layer 4/7 Retries
 Simplified circuit breaking
 Advanced debugging and tracing facilities
 Distributed stick-tables for stats collection and DoS mitigation

HAProxy Community vs HAProxy Enterprise 

HAProxy Enterprise Edition is an enterprise-class version of HAProxy that includes enterprise suite of add-ons, expert support, and professional services. It has some features backported from the HAProxy development branch.

ALOHA 

HAProxy Technologies’ ALOHA is a plug-and-play load-balancing appliance that can be deployed in any environment. ALOHA provides a graphical interface and a templating system that can be used to deploy and configure the appliance.

Versions 
HAProxy has had the following version releases:

Performance 
Servers equipped with 6 to 8 cores generally achieve between 200000 and 500000 requests per second, and have no trouble saturating a 25 Gbit/s connection under Linux. 64-core ARM servers were shown to reach 2 million requests per second and 100 Gbit/s.

Similar software 
 Nginx
 Gearman
 Pound
 Varnish

See also 

 LAMP, LYME, and LEAP

References

External links 
HAProxy Open Source Website
 HAProxy Enterprise Website
 HAProxy Wiki on GitHub
 HAProxy issue tracker on GitHub

Free web server software
Reverse proxy
Proxy server software for Linux
Free software programmed in C
Unix network-related software
Lua (programming language)-scriptable software